There were 8,372 hospitals in Japan in October 2018.  The largest number of hospitals were in Tokyo with 650 hospitals.

Aichi

Nagoya 
Aichi Cancer Center Hospital - Chikusa-ku, Nagoya
Aichi Saiseikai Hospital - Nishi-ku, Nagoya
Chubu Rosai Hospital - Minato-ku, Nagoya
Holy Spirit Hospital - Shōwa-ku, Nagoya
Japan Community Health care Organization Chukyo Hospital - Minami-ku, Nagoya
Japanese Red Cross Nagoya Daiichi Hospital - Nakamura-ku, Nagoya
Japanese Red Cross Nagoya Daini Hospital - Shōwa-ku, Nagoya
Meijo Hospital - Naka-ku, Nagoya
Meitetsu Hospital - Nishi-ku, Nagoya
Nagoya City East Medical Center - Chikusa-ku, Nagoya
Nagoya City University Hospital - Mizuho-ku, Nagoya
Nagoya City West Medical Center - Kita-ku, Nagoya
Nagoya Ekisaikai Hospital - Nakagawa-ku, Nagoya
Nagoya Memorial Hospital - Tempaku-ku, Nagoya
Nagoya University Hospital - Shōwa-ku, Nagoya
National Hospital Organization Higashi Nagoya National Hospital - Meitō-ku, Nagoya
National Hospital Organization Nagoya Medical Center - Naka-ku, Nagoya

Others
Aichi Cancer Center Aichi Hospital - Okazaki, Aichi
Aichi Cardiovascular and Respiratory Center - Ichinomiya, Aichi
Aichi Children's Health and Medical Center - Ōbu, Aichi
Aichi Medical University Hospital - Nagakute, Aichi
Anjo Kosei Hospital - Anjō, Aichi
Asahi Rosai Hospital - Owariasahi, Aichi
Atsumi Hospital - Tahara, Aichi
Bisai Hospital - Inazawa, Aichi
Chita City Hospital - Chita, Aichi
Chita Kosei Hospital - Mihama, Aichi
Daiyukai General Hospital - Ichinomiya, Aichi
Fujita Health University Hospital - Toyoake, Aichi
Gamagori City Hospital - Gamagōri, Aichi
Handa City Hospital - Handa, Aichi
Hekinan Municipal Hospital - Hekinan, Aichi
Hospital, National Center for Geriatrics and Gerontrogy - Ōbu, Aichi
Ichinomiya Municipal Hospital - Ichinomiya, Aichi
Inazawa City Hospital - Inazawa, Aichi
Inuyama Chuo General Hospital - Inuyama, Aichi
Kainan Hospital - Yatomi, Aichi
Kariya Toyota General Hospital - Kariya, Aichi
Kasugai Municipal Hospital - Kasugai, Aichi
Komaki City Hospital - Komaki, Aichi
Konan Kosei Hospital - Kōnan, Aichi
Nagoya Tokushukai General Hospital - Kasugai, Aichi
National Hospital Organization Toyohashi Medical Center - Toyohashi, Aichi
Toyohashi Municipal Hospital - Toyohashi, Aichi
Nishio Municipal Hospital - Nishio, Aichi
Okazaki City Hospital - Okazaki, Aichi
Shinshiro Municipal Hospital - Shinshiro, Aichi
Tokoname Municipal Hospital - Tokoname, Aichi
Tosei General Hospital - Seto, Aichi
Toyokawa City Hospital - Toyokawa, Aichi
Toyota Memorial Hospital - Toyota, Aichi
Toyota Kosei Hospital - Toyota, Aichi
Tsushima City Hospital - Tsushima, Aichi

Akita

Akita City Hospital (Japanese Wikipedia) - Akita, Akita
Akita Kousei Medical Center (Japanese Wikipedia) - Akita, Akita
Akita Red Cross Hospital (Japanese Wikipedia) - Akita, Akita
Akita University Hospital (Japanese Wikipedia) - Akita, Akita
Akita Cerebrospinal and Cardiovascular Center (Japanese Wikipedia) - Akita, Akita
Nakadori General Hospital (Japanese Wikipedia) - Akita, Akita
Hiraka General Hospital - Yokote, Akita
Japan Community Health care Organization Akita Hospital - Noshiro, Akita
Kakunodate Municipal Hospital - Semboku, Akita
Kazuno Kosei Hospital - Kazuno, Akita
Kitaakita Municipal Hospital - Kitaakita, Akita
National Hospital Organization Akita National Hospital - Yurihonjō, Akita
Yuri Kumiai General Hospital - Yurihonjō, Akita
Noshiro Yamamoto Medical Association Hospital - Noshiro, Akita
Akita Rosai Hospital - Ōdate, Akita
Odate Municipal General Hospital - Ōdate, Akita
Ogachi Central Hospital - Yuzawa, Akita
Omagari Kosei Medical Center - Daisen, Akita
Yamamoto Kumiai General Hospital - Noshiro, Akita

Aomori
Aomori City Hospital - Aomori, Aomori
Aomori Prefectural Central Hospital - Aomori, Aomori
Aomori Rosai Hospital - Hachinohe, Aomori
Hachinohe City Hospital - Hachinohe, Aomori
Hachinohe Red Cross Hospital - Hachinohe, Aomori
Hirosaki Municipal Hospital - Hirosaki, Aomori
Hirosaki University Hospital - Hirosaki, Aomori
Kuroishi General Hospital - Kuroishi, Aomori
Misawa Municipal Misawa Hospital - Misawa, Aomori
Mutsu General Hospital - Mutsu, Aomori
National Hospital Organization Aomori National Hospital - Aomori, Aomori
National Hospital Organization Hachinohe National Hospital - Hachinohe, Aomori
National Hospital Organization Hirosaki National Hospital - Hirosaki, Aomori
Towada City Hospital - Towada, Aomori
Tsugaru General Hospital - Goshogawara, Aomori

Chiba

Chiba City
Chiba Aoba Municipal Hospital - Chūō-ku, Chiba
Chiba Cancer Center - Chūō-ku, Chiba
Chiba Children's Hospital - Midori-ku, Chiba
Chiba Emergency Medical Center - Mihama-ku, Chiba
Chiba Kaihin Municipal Hospital - Mihama-ku, Chiba
Chiba University Hospital - Chūō-ku, Chiba
National Hospital Organization Chiba-East-Hospital - Chūō-ku, Chiba
National Hospital Organization Chiba Medical Center - Chūō-ku, Chiba
The Research Center Hospital for Charged Particle Therapy of the National Institute of Radiological Sciences - Inage-ku, Chiba

Others
Awa Regional Medical Center - Tateyama, Chiba
Chiba Cerebral and Cardiovascular Center - Ichihara, Chiba
Chibaken Saiseikai Narashino Hospital - Narashino, Chiba
Chiba-Nishi General Hospital - Matsudo, Chiba
Chiba Prefectural Sawara Hospital - Katori, Chiba
Chiba Prefectural Togane Hospital - Tōgane, Chiba
Chiba Rosai Hospital - Ichihara, Chiba
Funabashi Municipal Medical Center - Funabashi, Chiba
General Hospital National Health Asahi Central Hospital - Asahi, Chiba
Japan Community Health care Organization Funabashi Central Hospital - Funabashi, Chiba
The Jikei University Kashiwa Hospital - Kashiwa, Chiba
Juntendo University Urayasu Hospital - Urayasu, Chiba
Kameda General Hospital - Kamogawa, Chiba
Kimitsu Chuo Hospital - Kisarazu, Chiba
Kohnodai Hospital, National Center for Global Health and Medicine - Ichikawa, Chiba
Matsudo City Hospital - Matsudo, Chiba
Narita Red Cross Hospital - Narita, Chiba
National Cancer Center Hospital East - Kashiwa, Chiba
National Hospital Organization Shimoshizu National Hospital - Yotsukaidō, Chiba
Nippon Medical School Chiba Hokusoh Hospital - Inzai, Chiba
Teikyo University Chiba Medical Center - Ichihara, Chiba
Tokyo Dental College Ichikawa General Hospital - Ichikawa, Chiba
Tokyo Women's Medical University Yachiyo Medical Center - Yachiyo, Chiba

Ehime
Ehime Prefectural Central Hospital - Matsuyama, Ehime
Ehime Prefectural Imabari Hospital - Imabari, Ehime
Ehime Prefectural Minamiuwa Hospital - Ainan, Ehime
Ehime Prefectural Niihama Hospital - Niihama, Ehime
Ehime Rosai Hospital - Niihama, Ehime
Ehime University Hospital - Tōon, Ehime
Matsuyama Red Cross Hospital - Matsuyama, Ehime
National Hospital Organization Ehime Medical Center - Tōon, Ehime
National Hospital Organization Shikoku Cancer Center - Matsuyama, Ehime
Saijo Central Hospital - Saijō, Ehime
Saijo City Shuso Hospital - Saijō, Ehime
Saiseikai Imabari Hospital - Imabari, Ehime
Saiseikai Saijo Hospital - Saijō, Ehime
Shikoku Central Hospital of the Mutual Aid Association of Public School teachers - Shikokuchūō, Ehime
Sumitomo Besshi Hospital - Niihama, Ehime
Uwajima City Hospital - Uwajima, Ehime
Uwajima Tokushukai Hospital - Uwajima, Ehime
Yawatahama City General Hospital - Yawatahama, Ehime

Fukui
Fukui General Hospital - Fukui, Fukui
Fukui-ken Saiseikai Hospital - Fukui, Fukui
Fukui Kosei Hospital - Fukui, Fukui
Fukui Prefectural Hospital - Fukui, Fukui
Fukui Red Cross Hospital - Fukui, Fukui
Japan Community Health care Organization Fukui Katsuyama General Hospital - Katsuyama, Fukui
Municipal Tsuruga Hospital - Tsuruga, Fukui
National Hospital Organization Awara Hospital - Awara, Fukui
National Hospital Organization Fukui National Hospital - Tsuruga, Fukui
Sugita Genpaku Memorial Obama Municipal Hospital - Obama, Fukui
Tannan Regional Medical Center - Sabae, Fukui
University of Fukui Hospital - Eiheiji, Fukui

Fukuoka
Self-Defense Forces Fukuoka Hospital - Kasuga, Fukuoka

Fukushima

Soma General Hospital, Sōma, Fukushima

Gifu
National Hospital Organization Nagara Medical Center - Gifu, Gifu
Kizawa Memorial Hospital - Gifu, Gifu
Self-Defense Forces Gifu Hospital - Kakamigahara, Gifu

Gunma
Gunma University Hospital - Maebashi, Gunma
Kuryu Rakusen-en Sanatorium - Kusatsu Otsu Kusatsu, Gunma
Shibukawa General Hospital - Shibukawa, Gunma
Shibukawa Chuo Hospital - Shibukawa, Gunma
Nishi-Gunma Hospital - Shibukawa, Gunma
Sekiguchi Hospital - Shibukawa, Gunma
Sakadiku Hospital - Shibukawa, Gunma

Hiroshima
Self-Defense Forces Kure Hospital - Kure, Hiroshima
Takashitu Kure Hospital - Kure, Hiroshima
Shima Hospital - Hiroshima, Hiroshima

Hokkaidō
East Otaru hospital - Otaru, Hokkaido
Higashi Otaru Hospital - Otaru, Hokkaido
Municipal Otaru hospital (Japanese Wikipedia) - Otaru, Hokkaido
South Otaru hospital - Otaru, Hokkaido
Self-Defense Forces Sapporo Hospital - Sapporo, Hokkaido

Hyōgo

Hyogo Emergency Medical Center - Kobe, Hyogo
Japanese Red Cross Kobe Hospital - Kobe, Hyogo
Kobe Adventist Hospital - Kobe, Hyogo
Kobe City Medical Center General Hospital - Kobe, Hyogo
Kobe University Hospital - Kobe, Hyogo
Hyogo Prefectural Kakogawa Medical Center - Kakogawa, Hyogo
Nishiwaki Municipal Hospital - Nishiwaki, Hyogo
Hyogo Brain and Heart Center - Himeji, Hyogo
Japanese Red Cross Society Himeji Hospital - Himeji, Hyogo
National Hospital Organization Himeji Medical Center - Himeji, Hyogo
Self-Defense Forces Hanshin Hospital - Kawanishi, Hyogo
Takarazuka City Hospital - Takarazuka, Hyogo
Hyogo Prefectural Awaji Medical Center - Sumoto, Hyogo
Ako City Hospital - Ako, Hyogo

Ibaraki

Ishikawa

Iwate

Kagawa

Kagoshima
Amami Wakoen Sanatorium
Hoshizuka Keiaien Sanatorium
Kagoshima City Hospital

Kanagawa

Yokohama 
 Bluff Hospital, Naka-ku, Yokohama
 Kanagawa Children's Medical Center -  Minami-ku, Yokohama
 Kanagawa Cancer Center - Asahi-ku, Yokohama
 Yokohama City University Hospital - Kanazawa-ku, Yokohama
 Yokohama City University Medical Center - Minami-ku, Yokohama
 Yokohama Rosai Hospital - Kōhoku-ku, Yokohama

Others 
 Fujisawa City Hospital - Fujisawa, Kanagawa
 Kanagawa Dental University Hospital - Yokosuka, Kanagawa
 Odawara Municipal Hospital - Odawara, Kanagawa
 Self-Defense Forces Yokosuka Hospital - Yokosuka, Kanagawa

Kōchi

Kumamoto
Kikuchi Keifuen Sanatorium -  Kohshi-shi, Kumamoto
Self-Defense Forces Kumamoto Hospital - Kumamoto

Kyoto

Kyoto City 

Kyoto City Hospital 
Kyoto University Hospital 
National Hospital Organization Kyoto Medical Center 
Japanese Red Cross Society Kyoto Daiichi Hospital 
University Hospital, Kyoto Prefectural University of Medicine 
Rakuwakai Otowa Hospital

Others 

Self-Defense Forces Maizuru Hospital - Maizuru, Kyoto
Saiseikai Kyoto Hospital - Nagaokakyō, Kyoto
North Medical Center Kyoto Prefectural University of Medicine - Yosano, Kyoto
Fukuchiyama City Hospital - Fukuchiyama, Kyoto
Kyoto Chubu Medical Center - Nantan, Kyoto
Uji Tokushukai Hospital - Uji, Kyoto
Kyoto Okamoto Memorial Hospital -  Kumiyama, Kyoo

Mie

 Mie University Hospital - Tsu, Mie

Miyagi
Self-Defense Forces Sendai Hospital - Sendai, Miyagi

Miyazaki
 Junwakai Memorial Hospital, Miyazaki
 Miyazaki Prefectural Miyazaki Hospital, Miyazaki
 National Hospital Organization Miyazaki East Hospital, Miyazaki
 Nobeoka Hospital, Nobeoka

Nagano
 Aizawa Hospital, Matsumoto
 Asahi Nagano Hospital, Nagano
 East Nagano Hospital, Nagano
 Iida Municipal Hospital, Iida
 Kamiyamada Hospital, Nagano
 Matsumoto Medical Center, Matsumoto
 Nagano Chūō Hospital, Nagano
 Nagano Matsushiro General Hospital, Nagano
 Nagano Municipal Hospital, Nagano
 Shinonoi General Hospital, Nagano
 Shinshu University Hospital, Matsumoto

Nagasaki
Self-Defense Forces Sasebo Hospital - Sasebo, Nagasaki

Nara

Niigata
 Kido Hospital, Niigata
 Kuwana Hospital, Niigata
 Nagaoka Chūō General Hospital, Nagaoka
 Niigata Central Hospital, Niigata
 Niigata Medical Centre, Niigata
 Niigata University Medical and Dental Hospital, Niigata

Ōita
Self-Defense Forces Beppu Hospital - Beppu, Oita

Okayama
Oyama Shimin Byoin Hospital

Okinawa
Self-Defense Forces Naha Hospital - Naha, Okinawa
Adventist Medical Center-Okinawa - Nishihara, Okinawa

Osaka

Osaka City 
 National Hospital Organization Osaka National Hospital - Chuo-ku, Osaka
 Osaka Metropolitan University Hospital - Abeno-ku, Osaka
 Osaka City General Hospital - Miyakojima-ku, Osaka
 Osaka Dental University Hospital - Chuo-ku, Osaka
 Osaka General Medical Center - Sumiyoshi-ku, Osaka
 Osaka Red Cross Hospital - Tennōji-ku, Osaka
 Osaka Police Hospital - Tennōji-ku, Osaka
 St. Barnabas' Hospital - Tennōji-ku, Osaka
 Tane General Hospital - Nishi-ku, Osaka
 Yodogawa Christian Hospital - Higashisumiyoshi-ku, Osaka

Others 

Osaka University Hospital - Suita, Osaka
Saiseikai Senri Hospital - Suita, Osaka
Osaka Medical College Hospital - Takatsuki, Osaka
Kansai Medical University Medical Center - Moriguchi, Osaka
Kansai Medical University Hospital - Hirakata, Osaka
Higashiosaka City Medical Center - Higashiosaka, Osaka
Osaka Prefectural Nakakawachi Medical Center of Acute Medicine - Higashiosaka, Osaka
Kindai University Hospital - Osakasayama, Osaka
Sakai City Medical Center - Sakai, Osaka
Rinku General Medical Center - Izumisano, Osaka
Senshu Trauma and Critical Care Center - Izumisano, Osaka

Saga

Saitama

Shiga

Shimane
Shimane University Hospital - Izumo, Shimane

Shizuoka
Koyama Fukusei Hospital - Gotemba, Shizuoka
Self-Defense Forces Fuji Hospital - Oyama, Shizuoka

Tochigi
Sano Kosei General Hospital - Sano, Tochigi
Ashikaga Red Cross Hospital - Ashikaga, Tochigi

Tokushima

Tokyo

 Center for the Mentally and Physically Handicapped
 Ebara Hospital
 International Catholic Hospital (Seibo Hospital) 
 Japanese Red Cross Medical Center, Hiroo, Shibuya
 Jikei University School of Medicine Hospital
 Juntendo Hospital
 Keio University Hospital
 National Cancer Center
 National Hospital Organization Tokyo Medical Center
 NTT Medical Center Tokyo
 Ohkubo Hospital
 Self-Defense Forces Central Hospital, Setagaya
 St. Luke's International Hospital
 Tama-Hokubu Medical Centre
 Tama-Nanbu Chiiki Hospital
 Tobu Chiiki Hospital
 Tokyo Adventist Hospital
 Tokyo Medical University Hospital
 Tokyo Metropolitan Bokutoh Hospital
 Tokyo Metropolitan Children's Medical Centre
 Tokyo Metropolitan Hiroo Hospital, Shibuya
 Tokyo Metropolitan Komagome Hospital
 Tokyo Metropolitan Matsuzawa Hospital
 Tokyo Metropolitan Neurological Hospital
 Tokyo Metropolitan Ohtsuka Hospital
 Tokyo Metropolitan Tama Medical Centre
 Toshima Hospital
 University of Tokyo Hospital

Tottori

Toyama

Wakayama

Yamagata
 Nihonkai General Hospital, Sakata
 Okitama Public General Hospital, Nagai
 Shonai Hospital, Tsuruoka
 Yamagata City Hospital Saiseikan, Yamagata
 Yamagata Prefectural Shinjo Hospital, Shinjō
 Yamagata Tokushukai Hospital, Yamagata
 Yonezawa Municipal Hospital, Yonezawa

Yamaguchi
 Nagato General Hospital
 National Hospital Organization Iwakuni Clinical Centre
 Shimonoseki City Hospital
 Yamaguchi Prefecture Saiseikai Yamaguchi General Hospital

Yamanashi
 Kofu Municipal Hospital
 University of Yamanashi Hospital
 Yamanashi Prefectural Central Hospital
 Yamanashi Red Cross Hospital

References

Japan
 List
Healthcare in Japan
Hospitals
Japan
Hospitals